The Fiji women's national under-17 football team is the second highest women's youth team of women's football in Fiji and is controlled by the Fiji Football Association.

History
Fiji participated twice so far in the OFC U-17 Women's Championship. This was in 2016 and 2017. The 2016 tournament was a big success for Fiji as they managed to reach third place out of nine teams participating. They managed to get a 3–0 win against the Cook Islands, a 3–2 win against Vanuatu and a 2–2 draw against Papua New Guinea. These results sent them to the semi-final where they lost by 11 goals to 0 against New Zealand. In the Third place match however they managed to get a 3–2 victory against New Caledonia. Aliza Hussein managed to score the first goal ever for Fiji against the Cook Islands. Cema Nassau is the top goal scorer with five goals. In 2017, they also got Third Place.

OFC Competition History
The OFC Women's Under 17 Qualifying Tournament is a tournament held once every two years to decide the only qualification spot for Oceania Football Confederation (OFC) and representatives at the FIFA U-17 World Cup.

Current technical staff

Current squad
The following players were called up for the 2017 OFC U-16 Women's Championship

Caps and goals correct after match against New Caledonia on 15 August 2017.

References

External links
Fiji Football Federation page
Oceania Football Federation page

Women's national under-17 association football teams
women's